During the 2004–05 English football season, Charlton Athletic competed in the FA Premier League.

Season summary
A season after just finishing outside the European qualification spots, Charlton suffered a slight decline to finish in mid-table in a nonetheless respectable eleventh place. Charlton never looked like a team that had nearly qualified for the Champions League the previous season, but with nine games to go Charlton were still placed seventh and looked likely to replicate their seventh-place finish the previous season. Unfortunately, the usual end-of-season decline hit Charlton and they picked up only three points from those nine games, dragging the Addicks down to 11th.

Charlton's goal-shy attack was what let the team down during the season. Manager Alan Curbishley sought to solve this by signing prolific young striker Darren Bent from Championship side Ipswich Town.

Final league table

Kit
Charlton retained the previous season's kit, manufactured by Spanish apparel manufacturer Joma and sponsored by all:sports.

Players

First-team squad
Squad at end of season

Left club during season

Transfers

In
  Stephan Andersen -  AB £721,000, 24 May
  Bryan Hughes -  Birmingham City, Bosman, 1 July
  Dennis Rommedahl -  PSV, £2,000,000, 1 July
  Talal El Karkouri -  Paris Saint-Germain, £1,000,000, 11 July
  Danny Murphy -  Liverpool, £2,500,000, 10 August
  Francis Jeffers -  Arsenal, £2,600,000, 10 August

Out
  Richard Rufus - retired, 3 June
  Sérgio Leite - released, 7 June (later joined  Ovarense)
  Stephen Hughes - released, 7 June (later joined  Coventry City on 6 July)
  Gary Rowett - retired, 6 July
  Claus Jensen -  Fulham, £1,250,000, 23 July
  Paolo Di Canio -  Lazio, free, 10 August
  Chris Powell -  West Ham United, month loan, 10 September
  Michael Turner -  Brentford, undisclosed, 2 November
  Jamal Campbell-Ryce -  Rotherham United, undisclosed, 26 November
  Paul Rachubka -  Huddersfield Town, free, 6 December
  Chris Powell -  West Ham United, free, 17 December
  Graham Stuart -  Norwich City, undisclosed, 31 January
 Transfers in:  £8,821,000
 Transfers out:  £1,250,000
 Total spending:  £7,571,000

Match summaries

Premier League
Charlton started their Premiership campaign at Bolton. Both teams were hoping to improve on last season's respectful positions, with Bolton finishing eighth and Charlton seventh the previous season, and to also show their European credentials, but it just looked like one team would be on today's showing. Kevin Davies was denied by Dean Kiely after just 30 seconds to show the tough day the Addicks would have. Shaun Bartlett fouled Kevin Davies and Jay-Jay Okocha, who had gone the previous season without scoring, scored an early contender for goal of the season with a rasping 30-yard free kick which left Kiely clutching thin air. It was two shortly afterwards when Okocha turned from scorer to provider as his precise through ball found Henrik Pedersen, who held off Luke Young and slotted past Kiely. Kevin Lisbie then missed a glorious chance for the visitors when from six yards out, his shot was blocked by Jussi Jääskeläinen. Charlton improved in the second half but couldn't take their chances, with Shaun Bartlett and debutant Danny Murphy missing good opportunities, and that allowed Bolton to seal the game when Okocha scored an incredible second when he teased the Charlton defenders before unleashing a powerful drive past the helpless Dean Kiely. Bartlett then cleared an Okocha free kick off the line to prevent the Nigerian an amazing hat-trick of long range strikes. Eventually, Charlton got on the score sheet when a Danny Murphy free kick was headed home by Lisbie. But it was too late for a comeback and in the end Pedersen scored his second of the day when Gary Speed played him through and the Danish striker did the rest.

Charlton bounced back from the defeat at Bolton by beating Portsmouth at home. Charlton started the brightest when, from an early corner, Jonathan Fortune headed towards goal via a deflection, forcing a good save from Shaka Hislop. Then it was Portsmouth's turn when Yakubu crossed in to the Charlton box. Dean Kiely dropped the cross to Eyal Berkovic, who took too long to get a shot out. There was a quiet period in the game until Danny Murphy got a cross in which Kevin Lisbie managed to head onto the bar. Then Lisbie turned supplier, leading to Charlton's first goal. Lisbie crossed in and Portsmouth failed to clear, allowing Jason Euell to stab the ball past Hislop. Portsmouth then almost equalised soon afterwards with another cross. This one was from Yakubu, who crossed in for Patrik Berger. He took a shot which was blocked into the path of David Unsworth who in turn shot into the side netting. Kiely preserved Charlton's lead, denying Yakubu and Berger as Charlton went in 1–0 at half time. Charlton threatened at the start of the second half with efforts from Dennis Rommedahl and Shaun Bartlett but then Portsmouth got an unbelievable equaliser. A short free kick was given to Patrik Berger, who flicked up and volleyed incredibly from approximately 35 yards out, seeing the ball fly into the top corner. Charlton were looking good after that goal and were looking to get a late goal. Rommedahl and Bartlett were both denied by Shaka Hislop, who was having a good game until the 87th minute when Jonathan Fortune swung in a free kick which glanced off David Unsworth's head. Hislop failed to gather the ball as Charlton grabbed a late winner.

Charlton then faced Aston Villa at home. Villa started the brightest. Gareth Barry, carrying on from where he left off against West Brom, delivered a dangerous cross which went to Darius Vassell, who crashed his shot against the crossbar. Charlton then had a penalty appeal turned down after Nolberto Solano clipped Dennis Rommedahl's heel, but Charlton did not need a penalty soon afterwards as a cross from Hermann Hreiðarsson found Francis Jeffers, who leapt up and headed in his first goal for his new club. Jeffers scored his second after a long ball from Radostin Kishishev wasn't dealt with by Olof Mellberg, pouncing on the ball before guiding past Thomas Sorensen. Just before half time, Sorensen dived out at Kevin Lisbie's feet, getting injured in the process; Stefan Postma came on. In a quiet second half, the only real action was a third goal for Charlton and a first Charlton goal for Luke Young. Rommedahl produced a chipped through ball which deflected off Thomas Hitzlsperger into the path of Young, who confidently finished past the on-rushing Postma.

Results per matchday

FA Cup

League Cup
 21 September 2004: Grimsby Town 0–2 Charlton Athletic
 27 October 2004: Charlton Athletic 1–2 Crystal Palace

References

Notes

Charlton Athletic F.C. seasons
Charlton Athletic